Jonathan or Jon Klein may refer to:

 Jonathan Philip Klein (1956–2016), American dog behavior expert
 Jonathan Klein (Getty Images) (born 1960), founder of Getty Images
 Jonathan Klein (racing driver) (born 1987), American racing driver in Indy Lights
 Jon Klein (CNN) (born 1958), former president of the American television news network CNN
 Jon Klein (musician) (born 1960), English guitarist, producer and member of Siouxsie and the Banshees
 Jonathan Klein (actor), starring in The Bacchae
 Jon Klein (playwright), American playwright, see ACT Theatre
 Jonathan Klein, co-founder of production company New Generation Pictures
 Jonathan Klein, sound editor for The Mummy Returns